Edward "Eddie" Leddy (born 8 September 1951) is a retired Irish long-distance runner. He competed in the 3000 m steeplechase at the 1972 Olympics and in the 5000 m and 10,000 m at the 1976 Olympics, but failed to reach the finals. He won the 10,000 m event at the 1976 USA Outdoor Track and Field Championships.

References

Irish male long-distance runners
1951 births
Living people
Olympic athletes of Ireland
Athletes (track and field) at the 1972 Summer Olympics
Athletes (track and field) at the 1976 Summer Olympics